Sándor Pázmándy (16 March 1912 – 17 February 1989) was a Hungarian football midfielder.

References

1912 births
1989 deaths
Hungarian footballers
Budapesti TC players
Hungary international footballers
Association football midfielders
Hungarian football managers
AS Marsa managers
Espérance Sportive de Tunis managers
Hungarian expatriate football managers
Expatriate football managers in Tunisia
Hungarian expatriate sportspeople in Tunisia
People from Vecsés
Sportspeople from Pest County